Pettinari is an Italian surname, may refer to:
Leonardo Pettinari (rower), Italian Olympic silver medalist
Leonardo Pettinari (footballer), (born 1986) Italian footballer
Luciano Pettinari, Italian politician 
Stefano Pettinari, (born 1992) Italian footballer

Italian-language surnames